The Roman Catholic Diocese of Vladivostok was a Latin Catholic bishopric in eastern Russia and West Turkestan (1923-2002).

History 
It was established on 2 February 1923 as Diocese of Vladivostok, on Czarist Russian imperial territory, canonically split off from the Apostolic Vicariate of Siberia.

On 1991.04.13, following the dissolution of the Soviet Union, it lost huge territories to establish the Apostolic Administration of Kazakhstan and Apostolic Administration of Novosibirsk.

On 2002.02.11 it was suppressed, its territory being merged into the Diocese of Saint Joseph at Irkutsk, within which Vladivostok remains a deanery.

Episcopal ordinaries 
(probably incomplete; Roman Rite)
Bishops of Vladivostok
 Karol Slivosky (1923.02.02 – 1933.01.06), Russian.

See also 
 Mother of God Church, Vladivostok, possibly the former episcopal see

External links 
 GCatholic, with Google satellite photo

Former Roman Catholic dioceses in Europe
Former Roman Catholic dioceses in Asia
Christian organizations established in 1923
1923 establishments in Russia
Religious organizations disestablished in 2002
2002 disestablishments in Russia
Christian organizations disestablished in the 2000s